The 2010 California wildfires were a series of wildfires that were active in the state of California during the year 2010. During the year, a total of 6,554 wildfires burned  of land.

Fires 
Below is a list of all fires that exceeded  during the 2010 fire season. The list is taken from CAL FIRE's list of large fires.

References

 
California, 2010
Wildfires in California by year